Madeira Island Submarine Base – BSIM is a submarine base of the Brazilian Navy, located in Itaguaí, Brazil.

History
The BSIM was conceived by the Ministry of Defence in the early 2010s, in order to receive and continue the construction of the new submarines of the Navy by the Brazilian company Itaguaí Construções Navais (ICN), the base was also projected to be headquarters of the company. 

The base was inaugurated in 2020. The first Brazilian Scorpène class submarine  (S40), was launched on 14 December 2018. The  (S41) was launched on 11 December 2020. The construction of the submarines Tonelero (S42) and Angostura (S43) started in 2017 and 2018 respectively. Since 2018, the base is home to the construction of the Brazilian nuclear submarine fleet, starting with the Álvaro Alberto.

On 12 July 2021, the Navy transferred the Brazilian Submarine Force Command (ComForS) to the base.

See also

Future of the Brazilian Navy
List of Brazilian military bases
Submarine Development Program

References

Brazilian Navy
Defence companies of Brazil
Manufacturing companies of Brazil
Military installations of Brazil
Buildings and structures in Rio de Janeiro (state)
Companies based in Rio de Janeiro (state)
Shipbuilding companies of Brazil
Arsenals